Luka Grubor  MBE (born 27 December 1973) is a retired rower, born in Zagreb, who competed internationally for Yugoslavia, Croatia and Great Britain, as well as for Oxford in the 1997 Boat Race. Grubor won a gold medal in the men's eight at the 2000 Summer Olympics in Sydney, as a member of the British rowing team.

Grubor studied at Somerville College, Oxford.

He was appointed Member of the Order of the British Empire in the 2001 New Year Honours list.

References

1973 births
Living people
Yugoslav male rowers
Croatian male rowers
British male rowers
Oxford University Boat Club rowers
Rowers at the 2000 Summer Olympics
Olympic rowers of Great Britain
Olympic medalists in rowing
Olympic gold medallists for Great Britain
World Rowing Championships medalists for Great Britain
Medalists at the 2000 Summer Olympics
Alumni of Somerville College, Oxford